Raymond Norman Williams (25 April 1909 – 8 October 2001) was a New Zealand rugby union player. A wing, Williams represented Canterbury at a provincial level, and was a member of the New Zealand national side, the All Blacks, in 1932. He played one match for the All Blacks, against Wellington, but was injured and never played first-class rugby again.

Following the death of Phillippe Cabot in 1998, Williams was the oldest living All Black.

References

1909 births
2001 deaths
People from Taradale, New Zealand
University of Canterbury alumni
New Zealand rugby union players
New Zealand international rugby union players
Canterbury rugby union players
Rugby union wings
South African military personnel of World War II
New Zealand emigrants to Zimbabwe
Rugby union players from the Hawke's Bay Region